Rui Tiago Dantas da Silva (born 7 February 1994) is a Portuguese professional footballer who plays as a goalkeeper for La Liga club Real Betis and the Portugal national team.

Club career

Nacional
Born in Águas Santas, Maia, Porto District, Silva began his development at local F.C. Maia before completing it at C.D. Nacional, whom he joined in 2012. He made his professional debut on 26 January 2014 in a dead rubber Taça da Liga group match at Leixões SC, keeping a clean sheet in a 2–0 victory. His Primeira Liga debut came on 11 May in the final fixture away against Gil Vicente FC, giving away and conceding the penalty from which Diogo Viana scored the only goal.

Silva eventually became first choice for the Manuel Machado-led team, overtaking Brazilian Eduardo Gottardi.

Granada
On 27 January 2017, Silva signed a four-and-a-half-year contract at Spanish La Liga club Granada CF, as a replacement for Levante UD-bound Oier Olazábal. Costing €1.5 million, he was completely unused in his first season in which the Andalusians were relegated to the Segunda División, as Guillermo Ochoa was unchallenged.

Silva remained second choice, this time to Javi Varas, and debuted on 6 September 2017 in the second round of the Copa del Rey, a 3–0 away defeat to Real Zaragoza. He made four league appearances, the first being a 1–0 loss at Rayo Vallecano on 2 December while the veteran Spaniard was grieving the death of a family member.

Under new manager Diego Martínez, Silva became the starter and missed just two games as the Nazaríes finished second to CA Osasuna and won promotion in the 2018–19 campaign. He was given the Ricardo Zamora Trophy for best-performing goalkeeper in the league, and was also voted best in his position.

In 2020–21, Silva represented Granada in their debut European campaign, reaching the quarter-finals of the UEFA Europa League. He then chose to allow his contract to expire.

Betis
On 11 June 2021, Silva joined Real Betis on a five-year deal, effective as of 1 July. He started ahead of Claudio Bravo on his debut, a 1–1 draw away to RCD Mallorca on 14 August. Having competed with the Chilean throughout his first season, he raised the possibility of leaving in April 2022; in the same month, he sat on the bench as the team won the Copa del Rey Final.

International career
Silva won his sole cap for the Portugal under-21 side on 13 November 2014, playing the full 90 minutes in a 3–1 away friendly defeat against England. In August 2020, he had his first senior call-up for UEFA Nations League matches against Croatia and Sweden the following month.

On 20 May 2021, Silva was selected by manager Fernando Santos for his UEFA Euro 2020 squad. He made his debut on 9 June in the last exhibition game before the tournament, playing the entire 4–0 win over Israel in Lisbon.

In October 2022, Silva was named in a preliminary 55-man squad for the 2022 FIFA World Cup in Qatar.

Career statistics

Club

International

Honours
Betis
Copa del Rey: 2021–22

Individual
Segunda División: Best Goalkeeper 2018–19
Ricardo Zamora Trophy: 2018–19 Segunda División

References

External links

Portuguese League profile 

1994 births
Living people
People from Maia, Portugal
Sportspeople from Porto District
Portuguese footballers
Association football goalkeepers
Primeira Liga players
F.C. Maia players
C.D. Nacional players
La Liga players
Segunda División players
Granada CF footballers
Real Betis players
Portugal youth international footballers
Portugal under-21 international footballers
Portugal international footballers
UEFA Euro 2020 players
Portuguese expatriate footballers
Expatriate footballers in Spain
Portuguese expatriate sportspeople in Spain